"Books from Boxes" is the second single from Our Earthly Pleasures, the second album from the band, Maxïmo Park. The single was released on 11 June 2007 and became their fifth UK Top 20 single, peaking at #16 in the UK Singles Chart.

Track listing
CD
 "Books from Boxes" (Radio Edit)
 "I'm Gonna Be (500 Miles)" (Radio 1 Live Version) [The Proclaimers Cover]
 "The Unshockable" (Original Demo Version)

7" 1 (White Vinyl)
A. Books from Boxes"
B. Obstinate Ideas"

7" 2 (Blue Vinyl)
A. "Books from Boxes" (Original Demo Version)
B. "Don McPhee"

Digital exclusive 1 (Recordstore Bundle Only)
 "Books from Boxes" (Acoustic Version)

Digital exclusive 2 (Recordstore Bundle Only)
 "Books from Boxes" (Live in Amsterdam)

The two digital exclusives were only available until the single was released.

Charts
 #16 (UK)
 #89 (Germany)

References

2007 singles
Maxïmo Park songs
Songs written by Paul Smith (rock vocalist)
Songs written by Duncan Lloyd
Song recordings produced by Gil Norton
2007 songs
Warp (record label) singles